BBC Sessions / Live at Reading Festival '86 is a live compilation album by the British heavy metal band Saxon. It was recorded live in studio by the BBC's Tony Wilson for the BBC Radio 1 shows of the early 1980s and at the 1986 Reading Festival, where Saxon were the headliners.

Track listing
Friday Rock Show 15 February 1980

Studio B15 Live 25 May 1982

Reading Festival / Friday Rock Show recorded 23 August 1986, broadcast 24 October 1986

The recording here is incomplete, BBC Radio having broadcast:

Credits 
Biff Byford – vocals
Graham Oliver – guitar
Paul Quinn – guitar
Steve Dawson – bass guitar
Pete Gill – drums
Nigel Glockler – drums

 Production
 Tony Wilson – producer
 Tony Wilson – engineer

References

Saxon (band) live albums
BBC Radio recordings
1998 live albums
1998 compilation albums
EMI Records live albums